Uh Mamma is a song that was released February 24, 2006. It is the first single from Banaroo's third album Amazing.

Formats and track listings
These are the formats and track listings of major single releases of "Uh Mamma".
Maxi CD
"Uh Mamma"  – 3:14
"Uh Mamma (The Navigator RMX Vers 1.2)" - 4:20
"Uh Mamma (Retro Filter Mix)" - 4:21
"Uh Mamma (Instrumental)" - 3:12
"Call Me, Beep Me!" - 3:02

Charts

Weekly charts

Year-end charts

References 

Banaroo songs
2006 singles
Universal Records singles
2006 songs